Stanley Adams (August 14, 1907 – January 27, 1994) was an American lyricist and songwriter. He wrote the English lyrics for the song "What a Diff'rence a Day Makes" (song written by the Mexican composer María Grever in 1934) and the English lyrics for "La Cucaracha." Adams was the president of the American Society of Composers, Authors and Publishers (ASCAP) between 1953 and 1956, and again from 1959 until 1980.

Biography
Born in Manhattan, New York, Adams attended New York University where he earned a law degree in 1929. He was still at law school when he became a songwriter; his first song – "Rollin' Down the River" – written in collaboration with Fats Waller, became a hit after being recorded by Guy Lombardo. Adams also wrote lyrics to songs by Hoagy Carmichael, Ray Henderson, Victor Herbert, Oscar Levant, Sigmund Romberg and Max Steiner, and contributed songs to several Hollywood and Broadway musicals.

Adams died in Manhasset, New York, from cancer, at the age of 86.

Recognition
In 1988, Adams was awarded the Board of Directors Award at the Songwriters Hall of Fame. He also served on the boards of many charitable organizations including the Musicians Aid Society, the National Cultural Center, Music for the Blind, the American Federation of Musicians, the National Music Council, and the Music Commission of New York.

References

External links
Songwriters Hall of Fame - Notable Writers

1907 births
1994 deaths
Jewish American musicians
Songwriters from New York (state)
American lyricists
Deaths from cancer in New York (state)
People from Manhattan
20th-century American composers
20th-century American Jews